General Sir Thomas Lethbridge Napier Morland,  (9 August 1865 – 21 May 1925) was a senior British Army officer during the First World War.

Early life
Born in Montreal, Canada East, Morland was the son of Thomas Morland and Helen Servante. Educated at Charterhouse School and the Royal Military Academy Sandhurst, Morland was commissioned into the King's Royal Rifle Corps in 1884.

Military career

Service in West Africa
Morland later served in Nigeria, reaching the rank of lieutenant colonel and being appointed commanding officer of the West African Field Force in 1900. The following year he was in command of an expedition to Yola, leading to the defeat and deposition of the Emir of Adamawa in September 1901, and to British occupation of the Adamawa Emirate, important for the later occupation of the Sokoto Caliphate as it reduced slave traffic through the Adamawa area. Morland was wounded by a poisoned arrow during the fighting, but stuck to his command. In a despatch describing the expedition, the acting High Commissioner of Northern Nigeria gave him "very great credit for the successful issue of this important expedition." The following year he was appointed a Companion of the Distinguished Service Order (DSO) in recognition of his services (dated 25 April 1902). In 1902 he was appointed commander of the forces in Northern Nigeria, and served as advisor to the French and British commissioners appointed for boundary delimitation in the area. From 1905 to 1909, he was Inspector-General of the West African Field Force.

First World War
In 1910, Morland was promoted to brigadier general and given command of 2nd Infantry Brigade, a position he held until the outbreak of the First World War.

Morland then became General Officer Commanding (GOC) 2nd London Division in August 1914, then GOC of 14th Division in September 1914 and then GOC of 5th Division in October 1914. He was promoted to lieutenant general in 1915, and commanded X Corps through to April 1918. During this time, he was one of Plumer's corps commanders at the Battle of Messines.

At the end of the war, Morland took command of XIII Corps, a position he held until 1920, when he was promoted and made commander-in-chief of the British Army of the Rhine. Two years later, he was appointed General Officer Commanding-in-Chief of Aldershot Command and promoted to full general. He retired the following year, in 1923.

Morland died on 21 May 1925 and was buried in the English cemetery at Villeneuve, Montreux.

Family
In 1890, Morland married Mabel St. John, with whom he had two daughters.

In popular culture
Morland was portrayed by Eric Carte in the 2006 BBC docudrama The Somme - From Defeat to Victory.

References

|-

|-
 

|-

 

|-

 

1865 births
1925 deaths
Military personnel from Montreal
British Army generals of World War I
Companions of the Distinguished Service Order
King's Royal Rifle Corps officers
Knights Commander of the Order of the Bath
Knights Commander of the Order of St Michael and St George
People educated at Charterhouse School
Royal West African Frontier Force officers
Graduates of the Royal Military College, Sandhurst
British expatriates in Nigeria
People from colonial Nigeria
British Army generals